The Bahu Kalat River, also known as Bahu River, Dashtiari River and Silup River, is a river in the Sistan va Baluchistan province in Iran. It is located in Bahu district, Tribes are living here as follows Hooth, Khosag, Gorgaij, Rind, kalmati etc. which is about 90 kilometers from Chabahar County. The river is the longest and biggest river in the south-eastern portion of Iran, and flows into Gwatar Bay on the Pakistan/Iranian border, about 50 miles west of Gwadar.

References

Resources

(in Persian)
Map of Bahu Kalat River

Rivers of Sistan and Baluchistan Province
Landforms of Sistan and Baluchestan Province